John or Jon Isaac may refer to:

John Isaac (cricketer) (1880–1915), English cricketer
John Isaac (photographer), Indian-born photographer and author based in New York City
Jon Isaac or Jonathan Isaac (born 1997), American basketball player
John Noel Laughton Isaac, a British solicitor and the first British serviceman to die during World War Two

See also
John Isaacs (disambiguation)
Isaac John (born 1988), former rugby league footballer